Fleischer Studios was an American animation studio founded in 1929 by brothers Max and Dave Fleischer, who ran the pioneering company from its inception until its acquisition by Paramount Pictures, the parent company and the distributor of its films. In its prime, Fleischer Studios was a premier producer of animated cartoons for theaters, with Walt Disney Productions being its chief competitor in the 1930s. Today, the company is again family owned and oversees the licensing and merchandising for its characters.

Fleischer Studios characters included Koko the Clown, Betty Boop, Bimbo, Popeye the Sailor, and Superman. Unlike other studios, whose characters were anthropomorphic animals, the Fleischers' most successful characters were humans (with the exception of Bimbo, a black-and-white cartoon dog). The cartoons of the Fleischer Studio were very different from those of Disney, both in concept and in execution. As a result, they were rough rather than refined and consciously artistic rather than commercial, but in their unique way, their artistry was expressed through a culmination of the arts and sciences. This approach focused on surrealism, dark humor, adult psychological elements, and sexuality. Furthermore, the environments were grittier and urban, often set in squalid surroundings, reflecting the Great Depression as well as German Expressionism.

History

The Silent Era 
The Fleischer Studio was built on Max Fleischer's novelty film series Out of the Inkwell (1919-1927). The novelty was based largely on the results of the "rotoscope", invented by Fleischer to produce realistic animation. The first Out of the Inkwell films were produced through The Bray Studio. They featured Fleischer's first character, "The Clown," which became known as Ko-Ko the Clown in 1924.

In 1921, The Bray Studio ran afoul with legal issues, having contracted for more films than it could deliver to its distributor, Goldwyn Pictures. The Fleischer Brothers left and began their own studio Out of the Inkwell Films with Dave Fleischer as director and production supervisor, and Max as producer, at 129 East 45th Street, later to 1600 Broadway, Times Square, midtown Manhattan, New York City. In 1924, animator, Dick Huemer came to the Out of the Inkwell Films studio and redesigned "The Clown" for more efficient animation. Huemer's new design and experience as an animator moved them away from their dependency on the rotoscope for fluid animation. In addition to defining the clown, Huemer established the Fleischer style with its distinctive thick and thin ink lines. In addition, Huemer created Ko-Ko's companion, Fitz the Dog, who would evolve into Bimbo in 1930.

Throughout the 1920s, Fleischer was one of the leading producers of animation with clever moments and numerous innovations. These innovations include the "Rotograph", an early "Aerial Image" photographic process for compositing animation with live action backgrounds. Other innovations included Ko-Ko Song Car-Tunes and sing-along shorts (featuring the famous "bouncing ball"), a precursor to karaoke.

In 1924, distributor Edwin Miles Fadiman and Hugo Riesenfeld formed the Red Seal Pictures Corporation. Riesenfeld was the theatrical manager of the Strand, Rivoli, and Rialto theaters on Broadway. Because the Out of the Inkwell films were a major part of the program in Riesenfeld's theaters, the Fleischers were invited to become partners. The Red Seal Company committed to an ambitious release schedule of 26 films with The Inkwell Studio as the primary supplier. The following year, Red Seal released 141 films that included documentaries, short comedy subjects, and live-action serials. Carrie of the Chorus, also known as Backstage Comedies, was one of the Red Seal series that featured Max's daughter, Ruth in a supporting role. Ray Bolger made his screen debut in this series and dated Ruth for a short time.

Red Seal released cartoon novelty series such as The Animated Hair Cartoons by Cartoonist "Marcus," and Inklings. The Animated Hair series resembled the on-screen hand drawing gimmick established in Out of the Inkwell. In this case, "Marcus" produced high-quality ink line portraits of celebrities and political figures. Then through stop motion animation techniques, the lines and forms would break away to entertainingly re-form the portrait into another. Inklings was similar in concept to the Animated Hair films, but was more of a visual puzzle novelty using a variety of progressive scratch-off/reveal techniques and rearranged animated cutouts to change the images.

It was during this time that Lee de Forest started filming his  Phonofilms experiments featuring several of the major Broadway headliners. The Red Seal company began acquiring more theaters outside of New York and equipped them with sound equipment produced by Lee de Forest, displaying "talkies" three years before the sound revolution began. Because of Max's interest in technology, Riesenfeld introduced him to deForest. And it was through this partnership that Max produced a number of the Ko-Ko Song Car-tunes as sound releases. Of the 36 song films produced between 1924 and 1927, 12 were produced as sound films beginning in 1926 with standard silent versions as well. The first sound release was Mother Pin a Rose on Me. Other sound releases included Darling Nellie Gray, Has Anybody Here Seen Kelly?, When the Midnight Choo-Choo Leaves for Alabam, Coming Through the Rye, My Wife's Gone to the Country, Margie, Oh, How I Hate to Get Up in the Morning, Sweet Adeline, Old Black Joe, Come Take A Trip in My Airship, and By the Light of the Silvery Moon.

Red Seal owned 56 theaters, extending as far west as Cleveland, Ohio. But after only two years of operation, Red Seal was broke. Max (Fleischer) sought an appointment of receiver in bankruptcy in October 1926. Just as the situation looked hopeless, Alfred Weiss appeared from the horizon with a Paramount contact.

The Paramount deal provided financing and distribution. But due to legal complications of the bankruptcy, the title to Out of the Inkwell was changed to The Inkwell Imps (1927-1929) and the studio was renamed Inkwell Studios. One year into the relationship, the Fleischer Brothers discovered mismanagement under Weiss and left before the end of the Imps contract. Out of the Inkwell Films, Inc. filed bankruptcy in January 1929. In March, Max formed Fleischer Studios with Dave as his partner. Operations were first set up at the Carpenter-Goldman Laboratories in Queens. With a skeleton staff, Fleischer Studios started out doing industrial films, most notably, Finding His Voice, a technical demonstration film explaining Western Electric's Variable Density recording and reproduction system. Max Fleischer secured a new contract with Paramount to produce a revival of the "Bouncing Ball" song films, re-branded as Screen Songs, with The Sidewalks of New York as the first release on February 5, 1929.

 Sound films 
The early experiments with sound synchronization gave Fleischer Studios experience in perfecting the post-production method of recording, aided by several inventions by founder, Max Fleischer. And with the conversion to sound, Paramount needed more sound films, and cartoons could be produced faster than feature films. As the Screen Songs returned Fleischer to the established song film format, a new sound series, Talkartoons replaced the silent Inkwell Imps, the first being Noah's Lark released on October 25, 1929. Earlier entries in the series were one-shot cartoons, until the appearance of Bimbo as of the fourth entry. Bimbo evolved through several redesigns in each cartoon for the first year. While the intent was to develop him as the star of the series, it was the cameo appearance of a Helen Kane caricature in the seventh entry, Dizzy Dishes that took center stage. Audience reactions to the New York preview were so great that Paramount encouraged the continued development of the most famous character to come from the Fleischer Studio by that time, Betty Boop. While originated as a hybrid human/canine character, Betty Boop was transformed into the human character she is known as by 1932. Having become the main attraction of the Talkartoons, she was given her own series, which ran until 1939.

The "Jazz Baby" Flapper character, Betty Boop lifted the spirits of Depression Era audiences with her paradoxical mixture of childlike innocence and sexual allure. Being a musical novelty character, she was a natural for theatrical entertainment. Several of her early cartoons were developed as promotional vehicles for some of the top Black Jazz performers of the day including Louis Armstrong (I'll Be Glad When You're Dead You Rascal, You), Don Redman (I Heard), and most notably, the three cartoons made with Cab Calloway, Minnie the Moocher, Snow White, and The Old Man of the Mountain. This was considered a bold action in light of the Jim Crow policies active in the South where such films would not be shown.

In 1934, the Hays Code resulted in severe censorship for films. This affected the content of all of Paramount's films as well, which tended to reflect a more "mature" tone in the features of the Marx Brothers, W.C. Fields, and most of all, Mae West. As a result, each of these stars was released as Paramount changed the content of its films to reflect a more "general audience" in order to comply with the new Code and stay in business. Paramount had also gone through three reorganizations from bankruptcy between 1931 and 1936. The new management under Barney Balaban set out to make more general audience films of the type made at MGM, but for lower budgets. This change in content policy affected the content of cartoons that Fleischer was to produce for Paramount, which urged emulation of the Walt Disney product.

 While Paramount was a large organization with a network of theaters, its fiscal consciousness was largely responsible for preventing Fleischer Studios from acquiring the three-strip Technicolor process, leaving it available for a four-year exclusivity with Walt Disney, who created a new market for color cartoons, established by Academy Award winner, Flowers and Trees (1932).

Paramount acquiesced to the release of the Color Classics series starting in 1934. But with the exclusivity of the three-color process still held by Disney, Fleischer Studios used the available two-color processes, Cinecolor, a two-emulsion red and blue process, and Two-color Technicolor, using red and green. By 1936, the Disney exclusivity had expired, and Fleischer Studios used the three-color process in its color cartoons beginning with Somewhere in Dreamland and continued using it for the remainder of its active years.

The Fleischer Studio's greatest success came with the licensing of E.C. Segar's comic strip character Popeye the Sailor beginning in 1933. Popeye eventually became the most popular series the studio ever produced, and its success surpassed Walt Disney's Mickey Mouse cartoons, documented by popularity polls. And with the availability of full spectrum color, the Fleischer Studios produced three two-reel Popeye featurettes, Popeye the Sailor Meets Sindbad the Sailor (1936), Popeye the Sailor Meets Ali Baba's Forty Thieves (1937), and Popeye the Sailor Meets Aladdin's Wonderful Lamp (1939). This series of longer-format cartoons were an indication of the emergence of the animated feature film as a commercially viable project beginning with Walt Disney's Snow White and the Seven Dwarfs (1937).

The Fleischer Studios had reached its zenith by 1936, with four series and 52 annual releases. Due to the phenomenal success of the Popeye cartoons, Paramount demanded more, and the Fleischer Studio experienced rapid expansion in order to balance out the increased workload. The crowded conditions, production speedups, drawing quotas, and internal management problems resulted in a labor strike beginning in May 1937 which lasted for five months. This strike was a test case, the first launched in the motion picture industry, and produced a nationwide boycott of Fleischer cartoons for the duration.

Max Fleischer had been petitioning Paramount for three years about producing an animated feature. Paramount vetoed his proposals until the proven success of Disney's Snow White and the Seven Dwarfs (1937). Paramount now wanted an animated feature for a 1939 Christmas release. This request came at the time of preparations for relocating to Miami, Florida. While the relocation had been a consideration for some time, its final motivation was made a reality due to lower corporate tax structures and an alleged escape from the remaining hostility from the strike.

The new Fleischer Studio opened in October 1938, and production on its first feature, Gulliver's Travels (1939), went from the development stage begun in New York to active production in Miami. The score was by Paramount staff composer, Victor Young and recorded at the Paramount west coast facilities. While limited to only 60 theaters in a one-month release, Gulliver's Travels earned more than $3 million, in spite of exceeding its original $500,000 estimated cost. Accordingly, a second feature was ordered for the Christmas period, Mr. Bug Goes to Town (1941).

 Fall of Fleischer 
The personal relationship between Max and Dave Fleischer deteriorated during the Miami period due to complications associated with the pressures of finishing the studio's first feature film and Dave's very public adulterous affair with his secretary, Mae Schwartz. Max and Dave stopped speaking to each other altogether by the end of 1939, communicating solely by memo.

Dave gained total control of production in 1940, relegating Max to business affairs and research. The studio was in need of new products going into the new decade, but the new shorts series that debuted in 1939 and 1940, Gabby, Stone Age Cartoons, and Animated Antics, were unsuccessful. Theater operators complained, with the Popeye cartoons having the only value.

Paramount acquired the rights to comic book superhero Superman  in 1941, and the Fleischers were assigned to work on a series of animated Superman shorts. The first entry, Superman, had a budget of $50,000, the highest ever for a Fleischer theatrical short, and was nominated for an Academy Award.

The animated Superman series, with its action-adventure and science fiction fantasy content, was a huge success, but that did not help the studio out of its financial trouble. It was penalized $350,000 for going over budget on Gulliver's Travels, and the revenues earned from the rentals of the Popeye cartoons had to be used to offset the loss of $250,000 incurred by the rejection of cartoons in 1940.

 Acquisition by Paramount 

While profits dwindled, Paramount continued to advance money to Fleischer Studios to continue the production of cartoons with its focus mainly on Popeye, Superman, and Mr. Bug Goes to Town, a new feature film for the 1941 Christmas season; all in hope of rekindling the studio. On May 24, 1941, Paramount demanded reimbursement on the penalties still owed after 18 months and assumed full ownership of Fleischer Studios, Inc. The Fleischers remained in control of production until November 1941. Mr. Bug Goes to Town, intended for release in December 1941, was not released until February 1942, and never recouped its costs.

In spite of living up to his contractual obligations and delivering the film, Max Fleischer was asked to resign. Dave Fleischer had resigned the month before, and Paramount finished out the last five months of the Fleischer contract without the Fleischer brothers. The last cartoon produced at the credited Fleischer Studios was the Superman cartoon Terror on the Midway. Paramount formed a new company, Famous Studios, as a successor to Fleischer Studios effective July 3, 1942.

 Television 
With the exception of the Superman and Popeye cartoons, Paramount's cartoon library of releases prior to October 1950 was originally sold to U.M. & M. TV Corporation in 1955. A condition of the purchase required the removal of the Paramount logos and copyright lines from the main titles.

As soon as the Fleischer library was sold to television, Max Fleischer noticed that some of the cartoons were being shown without his name in the credits, which was a violation of his original contracts. On June 17, 1956, Max Fleischer filed suit against Paramount and its TV distribution partners, seeking $2,750,000 in damages. The infringement on his name was corrected on all subsequent prints exhibited on television.

Before U.M.& M. had finished the title alterations, the company was bought by National Telefilm Associates. NTA placed their logo at the heads and tails of the films and blacked out references to Paramount, Technicolor, Cinecolor, and Polacolor. The majority of the Fleischer cartoons were off the air by the mid 60s when the original copyrights were due for renewal. NTA failed to renew the copyrights, which placed the majority of the Fleischer film library (including the Color Classics series, the Screen Songs series, and Gulliver's Travels) into the public domain. Mr. Bug Goes to Town, various Betty Boop cartoons, and the 1938 Color Classic, The Tears of an Onion, are among the few films that remain under copyright to Melange Pictures, LLC.

In the mid-1970s, NTA converted 85 black and white Betty Boop cartoons to color through Fred Ladd's Color Systems company. The process was done by having the cartoons traced and re-colored by Korean animators. These were packaged in 1976 under the title Betty Boop for President. This was refashioned as a compilation feature, Hooray for Betty Boop, and ran on HBO in 1980.

Paramount has reacquired ownership of the original Fleischer film library (through their acquisition of Republic Pictures) and continues to own the theatrical rights.

 Popeye and Superman 
The Popeye series, a property licensed from King Features Syndicate, was acquired by Associated Artists Productions (a.a.p.), which later became part of United Artists (for info on the Popeye retitling, see the a.a.p. article) and Metro-Goldwyn-Mayer. Turner Entertainment, after briefly owning MGM outright, settled for ownership of the library, including the Popeye cartoons, in 1986. A small number of Popeye cartoons have also entered the public domain.

Superman, the other series based on licensing, reverted to National Comics after Paramount's rights to the character expired. TV syndication rights were initially licensed to Flamingo Films, distributors of the 1950s Superman TV series. All 17 entries in this series entered the public domain in the late 1960s, when National failed to renew their copyrights.

Nevertheless, the Superman and Popeye cartoons are now under the ownership of Warner Bros. Entertainment Inc.; Warner bought the original film elements to the Superman series in 1969, after becoming a sibling (and later the parent) to DC Comics.

 Home video 
Most of the Fleischer color titles have been widely available on video since the 1980s, often on inexpensive videotapes sold in supermarkets and discount stores. Animation fans, the UCLA Film and Television Archive, and more recently the Max Fleischer estate and Paramount Pictures (via the Republic/Melange library) have worked to release high-quality restored editions of the Fleischer cartoons. These have also been made available on pay-cable, home video, DVD, and online on YouTube. Many of these restored versions now include the original front-and-end Paramount titles.

Most of the silent Fleischer titles from the Out of the Inkwell/Inkwell Imps series have entered the public domain.

An official Betty Boop VHS set, Betty Boop Confidential, was released by Republic Pictures in 1995, included several black-and-white Betty Boop cartoons as well as Betty's only color appearance, Poor Cinderella.

There have been several video releases for the Superman series. These include a 1991 VHS set produced by Bosko Video, titled The Complete Superman Collection: Golden Anniversary Edition - The Paramount Cartoon Classics of Max & Dave Fleischer released as two volumes which featured transfers from 35mm prints. It was reissued on DVD as The Complete Superman Cartoons — Diamond Anniversary Edition in 2000 by Image Entertainment, and Superman Adventures in 2004 by Platinum Disc Corporation.

A third (and more "official") compilation using restored and remastered materials was released in November 2006 by Warner Home Video as part of their DVD box set of Superman films. In 2009, Warner gave these Superman shorts their own stand-alone 2-disc DVD release, Max Fleischer's Superman: 1941-1942.

Olive Films, under exclusive license from Melange/Viacom, acquired the rights to the 66 non-public domain Betty Boop cartoons, and released four volumes of Betty Boop DVDs and Blu-rays.

Warner Home Video has released all of the Fleischer Popeye cartoons in three volumes as part of the Popeye the Sailor DVD collection.

VCI Entertainment/Kit Parker Films' DVD compilation of all the Color Classics (except The Tears of an Onion), entitled Somewhere In Dreamland, was released in 2003. It includes only a fraction of shorts remastered from 35mm film, but otherwise taken from the best available sources Kit Parker could provide VCI, and digitally recreating the original front-and-end Paramount titles,  Animation archivist Jerry Beck served as consultant for this box set, as well as providing audio commentary for select shorts.

VCI Entertainment also released a DVD compilation of all the public domain Popeye cartoons (both Fleischer and Famous) entitled Popeye the Sailor Man Classic Cartoons: 75th Anniversary Collector's Edition in 2004.

In Japan, Mr. Bug Goes to Town was released on DVD in April 2010 by Walt Disney Studios Home Entertainment as part of the Studio Ghibli's Ghibli Museum Library collection.

 Fleischer Studios today 
In 1985, DC Comics named Fleischer Studios as one of the honorees in the company's 50th anniversary publication Fifty Who Made DC Great for its work on the Superman cartoons.

Today, a new iteration of Fleischer Studios effectively holds  the rights to Betty Boop and associated characters such as Koko the Clown, Bimbo and Grampy, though courts have never supported their ownership claims. It is headed by Max's grandson Mark Fleischer, who oversees merchandising activities. Fleischer Studios utilizes King Features Syndicate to license Fleischer characters for various merchandise.

In 2021, after decades of being shown in altered and worn prints, the Fleischer estate (in co-operation with Paramount Pictures) finally launched an initiative to formally restore the entire classic animation library from the surviving original negatives, beginning with Somewhere in Dreamland; the restored cartoon had its premiere on the MeTV network in December, that same year.

 Legacy and influence 
The loose, improvisatory animation, frequently surreal action generally termed "The New York Style", (particularly in films such as Snow White and Bimbo's Initiation), grungy atmosphere, and racy pre-Code content of the early Fleischer Studios cartoons have been a major influence on many underground and alternative cartoonists. Kim Deitch, Robert Crumb, Jim Woodring, and Al Columbia are among the creators who have specifically acknowledged their inspiration. Much of Richard Elfman's 1980 cult film Forbidden Zone is a live action pastiche of the early Fleischer Studios style. The Fleischer style was also used in the 1995 animated series The Twisted Tales of Felix the Cat. The studio's art style and surreal atmosphere was a central influence on the indie game Cuphead, with the studio being described as "magnetic north" for the game's art style.

 Fleischer Studios staff (1929–1942) 

Producers
 Max FleischerDirectors
 James Culhane (Mr. Bug Goes to Town; uncredited)
 Dave FleischerWriters

 Eric St. Clair
 Pinto Colvig
 Max Fleischer
 Dave Fleischer
 Warren Foster
 Dan Gordon Cal Howard Seymour Kneitel George Manuell
 Jack Mercer
 Carl Meyer Tedd Pierce Graham Place
 Hal Seeger
 Edmond Seward
 Isadore Sparber David Tendlar
 William Turner Jack Ward Bob Wickersham

Animators

 Tom Baron
 Bob Bemiller
 Eli Brucker
 Robert Bentley
 Willard Bowsky Orestes Calpini Joel Clive
 Herman Cohen
 Roland Crandall James Culhane Joe D'Igalo
 James Davis
 Nelson Demorest
 Anthony Di Paola
 H.C Ellison Frank Endres Al Eugster Otto Feuer
 Don Figlozzi
 Dave Fleischer
 Max Fleischer
 Lillian Friedman Astor George Germanetti Arnold Gillespie
 Tom Golden Reuben Grossman William Henning
 Winfield Hoskins
 Tom Johnson Abner Matthews Kneitel Seymour Kneitel Bob Leffingwell
 Michael Maltese
 Carl Meyer
 Thomas Moore
 George Moreno Jr.
 Steve Muffati Grim Natwick Bill Nolan Joe Oriolo Sid Pillet
 Graham Place Lod Rossner
 Ted Sears
 Hal Seeger
 Gordon Sheehan
 Ben Solomon Irving Spector
 Sam Stimson
 William Sturm
 Dave Tendlar Jim Tyer
 Edith Vernick
 Myron Waldman Harold Walker
 John Walworth Bob Wickersham
 Lou Zukor

Animation directors
(Note: An animator who is credited first in a Fleischer cartoon is a director of animation. Dave Fleischer's role during production is more in line with a creative supervisor)

 William Bowsky
 Orestes Calpini
 Roland Crandall
 James Culhane
 H. C. Ellison
 Al Eugster
 Arnold Gillespie
 Tom Johnson
 Seymour Kneitel
 Bob Leffingwell
 Bill Nolan
 Tom Palmer
 Graham Place
 Stan Quackenbush
 Dave Tendlar
 Myron Waldman

Layout and scenic artists

 Eddi Bowlds
 Hemia Calpini
 Robert Connavale Robert Little Anton Loeb Shane Miller Erich Schenk
 Gustaf Tenggren 

Voice actors

 Joan Alexander Dave Barry
 Jackson Beck
 Bud Collyer Pinto Colvig William Costello
 Margie Hines Cal Howard
 Little Ann Little
 Jack Mercer Billy Murray
 Julian Noa
 William Pennell
 Tedd Pierce
 Bonnie Poe
 Mae Questel Ann Rothschild
 Gus Wickie Kate Wright

Musical supervisor and arrangements

 Lou Fleischer (Supervisor, 1930–1942)
 George Steiner (1930–1935)
 Sammy Timberg' (1932–1942)
 Winston Sharples (1940–1942)

Selected filmography

See also 
 Animation in the United States during the silent era
 The Golden Age of American animation
 Famous Studios
 List of animation studios
 Camera Effects

References

External links 
 

 
Adult animation studios
American animation studios
American companies established in 1929
American companies disestablished in 1942
History of animation
Mass media companies established in 1929
Mass media companies disestablished in 1942
Paramount Pictures
Mass media companies based in New York City
1929 establishments in New York City
1942 disestablishments in Florida
1942 mergers and acquisitions